Ron Jaffe is an American photographer. He has photographed six U.S. Presidents, legislators, dignitaries and well-known celebrities in the fields of entertainment and sports.

Early life
Jaffe was born and raised in Alabama.  He moved to Los Angeles at the age of 18 to attend Pasadena City College with the goal of becoming a teacher.  Jaffe became interested in photography when he accompanied a fellow student on a shooting assignment.  The experience exposed Jaffe to a field he had never considered, and he began to pursue his new interest with a passion. He continued his coursework and became a teacher with the Pasadena Unified School District, but after a few years, decided to pursue his hobby as a profession.

Career
By the early 1970s, Jaffe was working full-time as a freelance photographer.  He shot fashion publicity photos and commercial ads for his primary clients, which included the designers Barco of California, Jag Swimwear, and DeWeiss. In 1974, Jaffe also began teaching photography at the university level as professor of photography at Chapman College – World Campus Afloat, aboard a ship travelling to South America, Africa and Europe.

In 1977, Jaffe signed a contract with Elson Alexandre where over the next two decades he photographed more than 37,000 formal and casual portraits of corporate executives, doctors, attorneys, judges as well as family photos of the company's clients.  During this period Jaffe also shot many celebrity portraits on an independent contractor basis capturing unique images of cowboy stars from Dale Robertson, and Gene Autry to Chuck Connors, Indian Iron Eyes Cody and Roy Rogers.

He also worked for the Richard Nixon Library and Birthplace, documenting power visits throughout Nixon's final eight years of his life. After Nixon's death, Ron worked for the library for another six years as a staff photographer and covered meetings with several world leaders at the Nixon library 
For the last 20 years Jaffe has shot over 1000 episodes of high-profile television shows such as Cold Case, CSI Miami, CSI New York, Friends, How I Met Your Mother, Mad Men, Rules of Engagement, Suddenly Susan, The West Wing, and Without a Trace, Castle, CSI Crime Scene Investigation, Hit the Floor, Jane the Virgin, NCIS, and Scorpion and current shows including The Neighborhood, Grown-ish, NCIS:Los Angeles, and SEAL Team. His work on episodic crime dramas involve not only shooting the show during taping, but all props, photos used in the storyline and all crime scene photos showing the circumstances of crime scene investigation for evidence.  In essence, Jaffe actually becomes the forensic photographer of episodic dramas.
 
In all, Jaffe has shot programs that have aired or are currently airing on the ABC, NBC, CBS, FOX, AMC, VH1, MTV, A&E, The CW, and CMT networks.  Because of his work on these shows Jaffe has been nominated twice for the Publicists Guild of America's Excellence in Stills Photography Award.

Major works

Camera and electrical department

Awards and honors
California Museum of Science and Industry Certificate of Achievement for Outstanding Photographer in the documentary category (1974)
1975 Photographer West Award
Black & White Spider Award nominee (2005) 
Certificate of Achievement in Recognition of Outstanding Photography Judges Choice award for Los Angeles Advertising Photographers of America (2006)
Honorary Color Master Fine Art (2007)
Photojournalism Photography Masters Cup (2008)
International Publicist Guild – nomination for Excellence in Stills Photography award (2008 and 2010)

 Second International Color Awards (2013)

 15th Annual Black and White Spider Awards Nominee in Nude 2020

 11th International Color Awards Nominee in People and Sports 2018

 16th Black and White Spider Awards Nominee in Photojournalism 2021

 Black & White International Spider Awards Nominee in Advertising Frightfully Sexy 2022

 Black & White International Spider Awards Nominee in Nude Vampires 2022

References

External links
Official website

Photographers from Alabama
Living people
Year of birth missing (living people)
20th-century births